Acalolepta oshimana is a species of beetle in the family Cerambycidae. It was described by Stephan von Breuning in 1954.

Subspecies
 Acalolepta oshimana omoro Hayashi, 1963
 Acalolepta oshimana oshimana (Breuning, 1954)

References

Acalolepta
Beetles described in 1954